Hephialtes is a genus of beetles in the family Cerambycidae.

References

Prioninae